The Ministry of Higher Education and Scientific Research is a government agency of Algeria. Abdelbaki Benziane is the minister. Its head office is in Algiers.

References

External links

 Ministry of Higher Education and Scientific Research 

Higher Education and Scientific Research
Algeria